Reham is a given name. Notable people with the name include:
 Reham Al-Farra (1974–2003),  Palestinian diplomat and journalist
 Reham Abdel Ghafour (born 1978), Egyptian actress
 Reham Khan (born 1973), British-Pakistani journalist, author and filmmaker
 Reham Yacoub (1991–2020), Iraqi human rights advocate and doctor